Bengaluru FC is an Indian professional association football club based in Bengaluru. The club was formed in 2013.

Bengaluru FC have won the I-League and the Federation Cup twice.

Key

 P = Played
 W = Games won
 D = Games drawn
 L = Games lost
 F = Goals for
 A = Goals against
 Pts = Points
 Pos = Final position

 IL = I-League

 W = Winner
 RU = Runners-up
 SF = Semi-finals
 QF = Quarter-finals
 R16 = Round of 16
 IZSF = Inter-zonal semi-finals
 IZF = Inter-zonal finals
 GS = Group stage

 PR1 = Preliminary Round 1
 PR2 = Preliminary Round 2

Seasons

Notes

References

Bengaluru FC
Bengaluru FC